Hyloxalus exasperatus is a species of frog in the family Dendrobatidae. It is endemic to Ecuador and found on the eastern slopes of the Andes in Pastaza and Morona-Santiago Provinces. However, it is suggested that specimens from Pastaza represent a different, possibly undescribed species.

Description
Males measure  and females  in snout–vent length (based on only six and two specimens, respectively). Toe webbing is absent but it has a dorsolateral stripe and a short oblique lateral stripe. It is similar to Hyloxalus whymperi but lacks heavy darkening on the abdomen of males. Male call is unknown.

Habitat and conservation
Its natural habitats are pluvial premontane and very humid premontane forests. Its altitudinal range is  asl. It is threatened by habitat loss and degradation caused by agricultural expansion and logging; introduced species might also be a threat.

References

exasperatus
Amphibians of the Andes
Amphibians of Ecuador
Endemic fauna of Ecuador
Amphibians described in 1988
Taxa named by William Edward Duellman
Taxa named by John Douglas Lynch
Taxonomy articles created by Polbot